Langley Peak is a peak  east of Curtiss Bay, rising above the west end of Wright Ice Piedmont in Graham Land, Antarctica. It was mapped from air photos taken by Hunting Aerosurveys (1955–57), and was named by the UK Antarctic Place-Names Committee for American mathematician Samuel P. Langley, one time Secretary of the Smithsonian Institution, and designer of the first satisfactory powered model airplane, in 1896.

References

Mountains of Graham Land
Davis Coast